The 2003 Radivoj Korać Cup was the inaugural season of the Radivoj Korać Cup, a competition formerly known as the Yugoslav Cup.

Venue

Qualified teams

Bracket

Quarterfinals

Semifinals

Final

References

External links 
 History of Radivoj Korać Cup

Radivoj Korać Cup (Serbia and Montenegro)
Radivoj
2002–03 in Yugoslav basketball
Serbia